In mathematics, perturbation theory works typically by expanding unknown quantity in a power series in a small parameter.  However, in a perturbation problem beyond all orders, all coefficients of the perturbation expansion vanish and the difference between the function and the constant function 0 cannot be detected by a power series.

A simple example is understood by an attempt at trying to expand  in a Taylor series in  about 0. All terms in a naïve Taylor expansion are identically zero. Thus, if a physical problem possesses a solution of this nature, possibly in addition to an analytic part that may be modeled by a power series, the perturbative analysis fails to recover the singular part.

See also 
Asymptotic expansion

References 
 J P Boyd, "The Devil's Invention: Asymptotic, Superasymptotic and Hyperasymptotic Series", https://link.springer.com/article/10.1023/A:1006145903624
 C. M. Bender and S. A. Orszag, "Advanced Mathematical Methods for Scientists and Engineers", https://link.springer.com/book/10.1007%2F978-1-4757-3069-2
 C. M. Bender, Lectures on Mathematical Physics, https://www.perimeterinstitute.ca/video-library/collection/11/12-psi-mathematical-physics 

Perturbation theory
Asymptotic analysis